Tigran Avinyan (born 28 February 1989) is an Armenian politician, Deputy Prime Minister of Armenia and former member of the Yerevan City Council from the list of Way Out Alliance (YELK). He is a founding member of the Civil Contract Party. In May 2018, he was appointed as Deputy Prime Minister under Nikol Pashinyan's new administration

References 

1989 births
Living people
Deputy Prime Ministers of Armenia
Russian-Armenian University alumni